All India Progressive Women's Association (AIPWA) is a women's organisation committed to achieving equality and women's emancipation. It has an organizational presence in 21 states in India. It was founded in 1991 as a national level mass organisation of women. AIPWA is the women's wing of the CPIML Liberation.

References 

Women's rights organizations
Organizations established in 1991
Women's wings of political parties in India
Women's wings of communist parties
Communist Party of India (Marxist–Leninist) Liberation